The Vanuatu Presidential Party (VPP) is a political party in Vanuatu.

History
The party was formed by Louis Kalnpel and former Presidents Ati George Sokomanu and John Bani.

In the 2012 general elections the party nominated 17 candidates, receiving 2.4% of the vote and failing to win a seat.

In the 2016 elections the party fielded eleven candidates, winning one seat; Samson Samsen in Santo.

The party didn't contest the 2020 election, and failed to win any seat in the 2022 election.

Election results

Parliament

References

Political parties in Vanuatu